Thomas Harrison (born 13 May 1942) is a former Australian cyclist. He competed in the men's sprint at the 1964 Summer Olympics.

References

1942 births
Living people
Australian male cyclists
Olympic cyclists of Australia
Place of birth missing (living people)
Cyclists at the 1964 Summer Olympics
Commonwealth Games medallists in cycling
Commonwealth Games gold medallists for Australia
Cyclists at the 1962 British Empire and Commonwealth Games
Medallists at the 1962 British Empire and Commonwealth Games